Mat Chapman (13 April 1865 – 28 November 1909) was an English cricketer active from 1890 to 1895 who played over 50 times for Leicestershire. As Leicestershire were a second-class county until 1894, his first-class debut was made for Liverpool and District in 1893. He appeared in 28 first-class matches as a right-handed batsman who sometimes kept wicket. He scored 633 first-class runs with a highest score of 56 and completed 21 catches with two stumpings.

In April 1882 when he was 17-years old Chapman enlisted in the Leicestershire Regiment of the Militia or Army Reserve, he was described as a Labourer.

References

1865 births
1909 deaths
English cricketers
Leicestershire cricketers
Liverpool and District cricketers
Royal Leicestershire Regiment soldiers
People from Arnesby
People from Narborough, Leicestershire
Cricketers from Leicestershire
Military personnel from Leicestershire